2019 WAFF U-15 Championship was the seventh edition of the WAFF U-16 Championship, the international youth football championship organised by the West Asian Football Federation (WAFF) for the men's under-15 national teams of West Asia. It was held in Zarqa, Jordan from 1 to 11 July 2019. The draw of the competition was held on 9 June 2019.

Saudi Arabia won the championship title for the first time in its history after winning all its matches.

Format
The groups winners of the three groups in the first round played in a single round-robin format, in order to determine the top three in the tournament. The second-placed teams played in the same way on the 4–6 positions, while the third-placed teams in their groups played on the 7–9 positions.

Participating nations
All West Asian Federation teams entered the competition except Qatar, United Arab Emirates and Yemen.

Officials

Referees
 Mohammed Salman Al-Noori (Iraq)
 Mohammed Bunafoor (Bahrain)
 Mohammad Ghabayen (Jordan)
 Jamil Ramadan (Lebanon)
 Taher Bakkar (Syria)
 Faisal Al-Balawi (Saudi Arabia)
 Abdullah Jamali (Kuwait)
 Adel Al-Naqbi (UAE)
 Emad Bojeh (Palestine)
 Qassim Al-Hatmi (Oman)

Assistant Referees

 Ahmed Sabah Al-Baghadi (Iraq)
 Salman Tlasi (Bahrain)
 Hamza Saadeh (Jordan)
 Mohammad Rammal (Lebanon)
 Rami Taan (Syria)
 Faisal Al-Qahtani (Saudi Arabia)
 Sayed Ali (Kuwait)
 Zayed Dawood Kamal (UAE)
 Ashraf Abuzubaida (Palestine)

First round

Group A

Group B

Group C

Second round

7th–9th classification

4th–6th classification

Final stage

Champion

Final standing

References

U16 2019
WAFF U-16 Championship
International association football competitions hosted by Jordan
WAFF U-16 Championship
WAFF U-16 Championship